The Republican Constitutional Union (UCR) was a Spanish political party created in 1893 by dissidents from the Possibilist Democratic Party (PDP) led by José de Carvajal y Hué, who opposed Emilio Castelar's decision to dissolve the PDP and join the Liberal Party following the 1893 Spanish general election. The party later joined with elements from the Progressive Republican Party (PRP) into the National Republican Party (PRN) in 1895.

References

See also
Liberalism and radicalism in Spain

Defunct political parties in Spain
Defunct liberal political parties
Political parties established in 1893
Political parties disestablished in 1895
1893 establishments in Spain
1895 disestablishments in Spain
Republican parties in Spain
Restoration (Spain)